P23 may refer to:

Aircraft 
 Curtiss XP-23 Hawk II, an American experiment fighter
 Piaggio P.23, an Italian transport
 PZL P.23 Karaś, a Polish light bomber and reconnaissance aircraft

Other uses 
 , a patrol vessel of the Irish Naval Service
 Makonde language
 , of the Armed Forces of Malta
 Papyrus 23, a biblical manuscript
 PTGES3, an enzyme
 Seligman Airport, in Yavapai County, Arizona, United States